The 1954 Calgary Stampeders finished in 4th place in the W.I.F.U. with an 8–8 record and failed to make the playoffs.

Regular season

Season standings

Season schedule

Awards and records
 None

References

Calgary Stampeders seasons
1954 Canadian football season by team